José Maria Cruxent (January 16, 1911 – February 23, 2005) was a professional archaeologist considered to be the "Father of Scientific Archaeology" in Venezuela. He was born in Barcelona, Catalonia, Spain. Cruxent is known for making significant contributions to understanding the cultural history of Venezuela from the Paleoindian period to the early Colonial period.

Education 
Cruxent was a student in archaeology at the University of Barcelona until the Spanish Civil War cut short his academic career in 1939. After the war, he moved to Venezuela where he eventually gained renown for reshaping its archaeology by applying the scientific method in field work (something that had been rare in archaeological excavations there).

Discoveries 
Cruxent was responsible for the discovery of archaeological sites at Nueva Cádiz and Taima-Taima. He extended the archaeological evidence for human presence in South America backward into the Late Pleistocene epoch.

It was at Taima-Taima that he discovered El Jobo projectile points and other stone artifacts dating to as early as 13,000 B.P., a major discovery in Paleoindian archaeology.

Cruxent was later asked to excavate La Isabella, the first Spanish settlement, as well as the tomb of Christopher Columbus in the Ciudad Colonial de Santo Domingo.

Museum Administration 
Cruxent eventually became the head curator and archaeologist for the Museo de Ciencias Naturales and founded the Department of Archaeology at the Instituto Venezolano de Investigaciones Científicas in Caracas.

Artistic career 
In the latter portion of his life, Cruxent became an artist in the abstract expressionism movement. His paintings often depicted his archaeological discoveries and were reminiscent of cave painting. He did not stick to one medium, but rather experimented with many different materials and textures. He continued to work as a professor and artist until his death in 2005 at the age of 94.

Publications

Books 
Venezuelan Archaeology, 1963
An Archaeological Chronology of Venezuela, V2: Social Science Monographs, V6, 20, 1964
Archaeology at La Isabela: America's First European Town, 2002

Articles
Early Man in the West Indies, 1997
Medieval Foothold in the Americas,1997
An El Jobo Mastodon Kill at Tiama-Taima, Venezuela, 1978
Archaeology of Cotua Island, Amazonas Territory, Venezuela, 1950
Determination of the Provenience of Majolica Pottery Found in the Caribbean Area Using Its Gamma-Ray Induced Thermoluminescence, 1975

References

1911 births
2005 deaths
Venezuelan archaeologists
Spanish emigrants to Venezuela
University of Barcelona alumni
20th-century archaeologists